For other ship classes of the same name see Nasty-type patrol boat

The Turkish Nasty type patrol boats were a set of two fast patrol boats operated by the Turkish Navy during the 1960s and early 1970s.

Construction
The two vessels were originally built in Norway for the post-war German Navy, being purchased in the 1960s for evaluation purposes. 
They were built by the Norwegian company Båtservice Verft, of Mandal, to a design based on their prototype fast patrol boat, the Nasty. 
At the end of the evaluation period the German Navy released them in 1964 for transfer to the Turkish navy as military aid.

Service history
The two boats were commissioned into the Turkish Navy in 1964 as Doğan ("Falcon") and Martı ("Seagull"), recalling the names of two previous fast attack craft in Turkish service.

However they remained in service for less than 10 years, being discarded in 1973.

List of vessels

Notes

References
 Gardiner, Robert; Chumbley, Stephen Conway's All The World's Fighting Ships 1947–1995 (1995) Naval Institute Press, Annapolis 

Torpedo boats of the Turkish Navy
Napier Deltic
Ships built in Mandal, Norway
Patrol boat classes